Agios railway station or Agios Panteleimonas is the railway station of Agios Panteleimonas in West Macedonia, Greece.

History
Opened in June 1894 as Pateli railway station in what was then the Ottoman Empire at the completion of the Société du Chemin de Fer ottoman Salonique-Monastir, a branchline of the Chemins de fer Orientaux from Thessaloniki to Bitola. During this period, Northern Greece and the southern Balkans where still under Ottoman rule, and Skydras was known as Vertekop. Skydra was annexed by Greece on 18 October 1912 during the First Balkan War. The station building was built in 1916 following a decision of the French headquarters in Thessaloniki, with Serbian soldiers worked on the construction of the building. In May 1918, the station was bombed by the German air force. On 17 October 1925 The Greek government purchased the Greek sections of the former Salonica Monastir railway, and the railway became part of the Hellenic State Railways, with the remaining section north of Florina seeded to Yugoslavia. In 1926 the station, along with the settlement, was renamed Agios Panteleimonas. 

Since 2007, the station is served by the Proastiakos Thessaloniki services to New Railway Station. In 2008, all Proastiakos were transferred from OSE to TrainOSE. In 2009, with the Greek debt crisis unfolding OSE's Management was forced to reduce services across the network. Timetables were cutback, and routes closed as the government-run entity attempted to reduce overheads. In August 2013, Proastiakos services where extended to Florina. In 2017 OSE's passenger transport sector was privatised as TrainOSE, currently a wholly-owned subsidiary of Ferrovie dello Stato Italiane infrastructure, including stations, remained under the control of OSE. In July 2022, the station began being served by Hellenic Train, the rebranded TranOSE.

Facilities
The station is still housed in the original 19th-century brick-built station building; however, as of (2020) the station is unstaffed, with no staffed booking office at peek timesit and rundown. However, there are waiting rooms. The platforms have no shelters or seating, but seeing is located under the canapy, as well as a public payphone. The station signage advertised toilets, but these are now closedThere are no Dot-matrix display departure and arrival screens or timetable poster boards on the platforms. The station, however, has a buffet called ΤΑΒΕΡΝΑ ΣΤΑΘΜΟΣ ΑΓΡΑ located in an adjoining building. There is room for Parking in the forecourt, but not designated parking.

Services
As of 2023, the station is served on a daily basis by six Regional trains between Thessaloniki and Florina. There are no Services to Bitola as the short international connection is now disused, with all international traffic being routed via Idomeni and Gevgelija.

Station Layout

See also
Railway stations in Greece
Hellenic Railways Organization
Hellenic Train
Proastiakos

Further reading

References

Railway stations in West Macedonia
Railway stations opened in 1894
Buildings and structures in Florina (regional unit)